Statistics of Czechoslovak First League in the 1953 season.

Overview
It was contested by 14 teams, and ÚDA Praha won the championship. Josef Majer was the league's top scorer with 13 goals.

Stadia and locations

League standings

Results

Top goalscorers

References

Czechoslovakia - List of final tables (RSSSF)

Czechoslovak First League seasons
Czech
Czech
1
1